Moshir intersection is an intersection in central Shiraz, Iran between Lotfali Khan Street, Qa'ani Street and Tohid (Dariush) Street.

Transportation

Streets
 Lotfali Khan Street
 Tohid (Dariush) Street
 North Qa'ani Street

Buses
 Route 4
 Route 35
 Route 39
 Route 155

Streets in Shiraz